Bromofenofos is an anthelminthic agent used in veterinary medicine.  It is used to treat common liver fluke (Fasciola hepatica) infections in cattle and sheep.

It is teratogenic.

References 

Anthelmintics
Bromoarenes
Biphenyls
Organophosphates
Phenols
Veterinary drugs